The 1999 Nigerian Senate election in Lagos State was held on February 20, 1999, to elect members of the Nigerian Senate to represent Lagos State. Wahab Dosunmu representing Lagos Central, Tokunbo Afikuyomi representing Lagos West and Seye Ogunlewe representing Lagos East all won on the platform of the Alliance for Democracy.

Overview

Summary

Results

Lagos Central 
The election was won by Wahab Dosunmu of the Alliance for Democracy.

Lagos West 
The election was won by Tokunbo Afikuyomi of the Alliance for Democracy.

Lagos East 
The election was won by Seye Ogunlewe of the Alliance for Democracy.

References 

Lag
Lag
Lagos State Senate elections